The Sandamara blind snake (Anilios troglodytes) is a species of snake in the Typhlopidae family.

References

Anilios
Reptiles described in 1981
Snakes of Australia